Bagh-e Bazm (also Romanized as Bāgh-e Bazm, Bagh Bazm, and Bāgh-i-Bazm; also known as Bāgh-e Vaz) is a village in Mashiz Rural District, in the Central District of Bardsir County, Kerman Province, Iran. At the 2006 census, its population was 159, in 41 families.

References 

Populated places in Bardsir County